Cameron John Henning (born November 24, 1960) is a Canadian former competitive swimmer, who competed for his native country at the 1984 Summer Olympics in Los Angeles, California.  There he won the bronze medal in the men's 200-metre backstroke.

See also
 List of Commonwealth Games medallists in swimming (men)
 List of Olympic medalists in swimming (men)

References
Canadian Olympic Committee

1960 births
Living people
Canadian male backstroke swimmers
Olympic bronze medalists for Canada
Olympic bronze medalists in swimming
Olympic swimmers of Canada
Swimmers from Edmonton
Swimmers at the 1982 Commonwealth Games
Swimmers at the 1983 Pan American Games
Swimmers at the 1984 Summer Olympics
Medalists at the 1984 Summer Olympics
Commonwealth Games medallists in swimming
Commonwealth Games gold medallists for Canada
Commonwealth Games silver medallists for Canada
Pan American Games competitors for Canada
20th-century Canadian people
21st-century Canadian people
Medallists at the 1982 Commonwealth Games